The year 1992 in radio involved some significant events.


Events
 January - KUBE/Seattle completes its shift from Mainstream Top 40 to Rhythmic CHR.
 January 15 - AC-formatted KZOL/Salt Lake City flips to modern rock as KXRK
 January 22 – Rebel forces occupy Zaire's national radio station in Kinshasa and broadcast a demand for the government's resignation.
 February - WPLJ in New York City completes its shift from Top 40 to Hot adult contemporary. In addition, the station rebrands from "Mojo Radio" to the current "95-5 PLJ."
 February 12 – Washington, D.C. area Top 40 radio station WAVA-FM changes to a religious format, which continues to this day.
 February 18 – After over two decades as Baltimore's premier Top 40/CHR outlet (including a brief stint with disco and a few name and call letter changes), WBSB flips to Gold-based Hot AC as "Variety 104.3."  
 February 18 - The "Young Country" format debuts with KRSR 105.3 in Dallas dropping its hot AC format to become KRRM.  The KRRM calls stood for "The Armadillo," but were just a placeholder for the KYNG calls, which it would acquire from a station in Coos Bay, Oregon.
 February 21 - ABC-5 radio station "Kool 106" (later 106.7 Dream FM) launched.
 April 20 - KKDJ/Fresno flips from album rock to modern rock
 May 22 - KMMK/Las Vegas flips from adult contemporary to modern rock as KEDG
 June 22 – Radio Wimbledon, the Official Radio Station of the Wimbledon Tennis Championships is launched.
 August 1 - The FCC relaxes its longstanding rule allowing ownership of only one station per service per market.  The new rules allow two stations per service per market and spur a big round of consolidation that would cash out owners like Noble Broadcast Group, Malrite Communications, Shamrock Communications and TK Communications.
 September 8 – KJJO in Minneapolis, Minnesota flips from modern rock to country music.
 October - Dallas/Ft. Worth gets its first duopoly as Alliance Broadcasting and KYNG take over KODZ "Oldies 94.9."  The station is promptly flipped to a soft-leaning country format as KSNN "Sunny 95."
 October 26 – WAPW/Atlanta flips from CHR to Modern rock as "99X".
 November 1 – KOAI/Dallas-Fort Worth drops its smooth jazz format as "106.1 The Oasis" to bring top-40 back to the market as KHKS "106.1 Kiss FM."  (KEGL had left the format in the summer.)  In response, KCDU "CD 107.5" switched from Classic rock to Smooth Jazz a day later, picking up the KOAI call letters and "Oasis" moniker and firing PD Gary Reynolds, who had been hired just two weeks earlier. 
 November 9 - WIBF/Philadelphia flipped from ethnic to modern rock as "WDRE".
 Late November - WHTE-FM's new branding went live and became 101.9 FM in the Charlottesville, Virginia Area.
 December 25 - KQLZ/Los Angeles drops their "Pirate Radio" branding, and the album rock format, for modern rock as "100.3 FM."

Debuts
January 4 — ESPN Radio debuts as a weekend service (under the name "SportsRadio ESPN"), with Keith Olbermann, Tony Bruno and Chuck Wilson among the first group of hosts for the flagship program GameNight.
 April — Country Countdown USA, a countdown program spotlighting the top 30 songs of the week, as reported by Radio & Records magazine. The show is hosted by Lon Helton, country editor for R&R, and features an in-studio interview with a currently popular country music singer or act.
 October 10 – Billboard reintroduces the Crossover chart publishing its last chart after nearly 22 months. This time it is renamed the Top 40/Rhythm-Crossover chart, which would later be christened as the Rhythmic Contemporary chart in 1997.

No dates
WTCX in Lakeville, Minnesota signs on the air with a Hot AC format.
Armstrong & Getty show debuts

Closings

 December 30 – English service of Radio Luxembourg closes down after 59 years of broadcasting.

Deaths
February 2 - Bert Parks, American actor, singer, and radio and television announcer (born 1914) 
February 4 - John Dehner, American actor in radio, television, and films (born 1915) 
February 15 - Marcos Rodriguez, Sr., Spanish radio pioneer, founder of KESS and Cuban entrepreneur (65)
March 18 - Ed Prentiss, American actor in radio, perhaps best known for portraying the title role on the radio version of Captain Midnight (born 1909?) 
May 17 - Lawrence Welk, American musician, radio and television personality (born 1903)
July 9 - Eric Sevareid, American news reporter (born 1912)
October 16 - Shirley Booth, award-winning American actress and radio personality (born 1898)

See also
radio broadcasting

References

 
Radio by year